Commission des écoles catholiques de Québec (C.É.C.Q. "Quebec Catholic School Commission") was a Roman Catholic school district which operated schools in Quebec City and Vanier, Quebec.

It was first established in 1846. Despite being annexed into Quebec City, Charlesbourg Ouest, Duberger les Saules, and Neufchâtel did not join CECQ. It was abolished in 1998. Now Commission scolaire de la Capitale operates secular francophone schools and Central Quebec School Board operates secular anglophone ones.

Schools
Secondary:
 St. Patrick's High School - the Anglophone secondary
 École Joseph-François-Perrault
 École Cardinal-Roy
 École Jean-de-Brébeuf  (Sec. 3–5)
 École Boudreau
 École Vanier
 École Notre-Dame-de-Roc-Amadour (Sec. 1–2)
 École Marie-de-l'Incarnation (sec. 1–2)
 Centre de formation en entreprise et récupération (CFER)
 Centre Jeunesse-Atout 
 Hôtel-Dieu-du-Sacré-Coeur (hospital setting)

Primary:
 École Anne-Hébert
 École Chanoine-Côté
 École Dominique-Savio
 École Marguerite Bourgeoys
 École Notre-Dame-du-Canada
 École Sacré-Coeur
 École Stadacona
 École St-Albert-le-Grand
 École St-Fidèle
 École St-François d'Assise
 École St-Jean-Baptiste
 École St-Malo
 École St-Maurice 
 École St-Paul-Apôtre
 École St-Pie X (1st cycle)
 École St-Pie X (2nd cycle)
 École St-Roch
 École St-Sacrement
 École Ste-Odile
 Hôtel-Dieu-du-Sacré-Coeur

References

External links
 
Education in Quebec City
Historical school districts in Quebec
1846 establishments in Canada
Educational institutions established in 1846
1998 disestablishments in Quebec
Educational institutions disestablished in 1998